Riseholme is a small village and civil parish in the West Lindsey district of Lincolnshire, England. The population of the civil parish was 450 at the 2011 census.

Riseholme Park 
Riseholme Hall, an 18th-century country house, stands in the Riseholme Park estate. Between 1840 and 1880 the house served as the Episcopal Palace for the Bishops of Lincoln. In 1851, the Church of St Mary was built by Bishop John Kaye to replace a ruined medieval church. Bishop Kaye lies buried in the churchyard there, along with his successor, Bishop Christopher Wordsworth.

Today, Riseholme Park is the site of the rural science campus of the University of Lincoln (often referred to as Riseholme Park), and the home of Riseholme College, the University of Lincoln's main Further Education department. The college provides courses in small animals, forestry and arboriculture, equine (horses), horticulture and agriculture.

In 1994 Princess Anne opened a new residential training college for the Inland Revenue (HM Revenue and Customs), Lawress Hall, at Riseholme Park. The college has two farms, one on the main site at Riseholme, and one in the nearby village of Nettleham (Lodge Farm, Nettleham). Facilities include an AstroTurf pitch, rugby and football pitches, fishing, halls for corporate events and outdoor activities.

See also 
 Riseholme Hall

References

External links
 
 University of Lincoln – Riseholme Park
 Lincolnshire School of Agriculture (University of Lincoln)
 

Villages in Lincolnshire
Civil parishes in Lincolnshire
West Lindsey District